Statistics of the Latvian Higher League for the 1926 season- RFK were the league champions:

League standings
1st stage: Riga Group

2nd stage: Finals

References

External links 
RSSSF

1926
Lat
Lat
Football Championship